Brian Toland is an Irish former rugby union player.

Career
Toland's played senior rugby for amateur side Old Crescent in the All-Ireland League, and he enjoyed a brief spell at provincial level with Munster in 1995, featuring in both of the provinces first ever fixtures in the Heineken Cup.

References

External links
Munster Profile

Living people
Irish rugby union players
Cork Constitution players
Munster Rugby players
Rugby union number eights
Rugby union flankers
1971 births
Rugby union players from Limerick (city)